Vi, short for Violet, is a character from  Riot Games' League of Legends media franchise. She was introduced as a playable character, or "Champion" within series lore, in a December 2012 update for the 2009 multiplayer online battle arena video game of the same name, which was complemented by an official upload track to commemorate her introduction. She is presented as an impulsive and contemptuous woman who uses a massive pair of gauntlets powered with magical energy as her weapon of choice. Although she is nicknamed The Piltover Enforcer because of her association with the city's Guardians, she is a former criminal who hails from Zaun, originally the undercity region of Piltover. She is the archenemy as well as elder sister of the terrorist Jinx, another League of Legends Champion.

Vi has appeared in various derivative works of the franchise, most notably as one of the lead characters of the Netflix animated series Arcane, where she is voiced by Hailee Steinfeld. Storylines explored by Arcane that involve Vi include her history with Jinx, who was originally named Powder, as well as her potential love interest, the Piltover noblewoman Caitlyn Kiramman. Vi has received a generally positive reception, especially for Arcane iteration of the character.

Concept and design
Riot Games designer Josh Singh originally conceived the character as a girl named Ruby, who wears roller-skates. Singh's original concept was discarded after two years of development; she was renamed and redesigned by Paul Kwon, who gave her the code name "Piltover Enforcer". Kwon's colleague August Browning approved of his character work and decided to utilize the character as part of the team's ongoing work with introducing new playable Champions for League of Legends. Browning leaned on Kwon's illustration of Vi with oversized gloves, and as a result her gameplay mechanics are primarily based on the archetype of a punk girl with an aggressive personality.

Graham McNeill was the writer responsible for coming up with Vi's backstory as an ex-criminal who assumes the role of a "bad cop" on behalf of the prosperous city of Piltover. Vi was the first League of Legends champion to receive a login screen accompanied an original, lyrical song track performed by Nicki Taylor and Cia Court, her English voice actress for the video game. Christian Linke and Alex Yee were involved with the lyrical song track, as well as the music and narrative storyboarding for Get Jinxed, the first character-driven cinematic released for a League of Legends champion which served to introduce Jinx, Vi's sister. Linke and Yee would later serve as showrunners of the animated television series adaptation of League of Legends, Arcane.

By September 2021, Netflix announced that Vi is one of the lead characters of Arcane, and that Hailee Steinfeld has been cast for the role. For Linke and Yee, the starring roles for Jinx and Vi in the series' narrative is a natural continuation of their creative work on both characters which began nine years before the release of Arcane season one. In an interview with Engadget, Linke explained that Jinx and Vi were always intriguing characters work with because they offer very different perspectives when paired with each other: not only do they possess opposing personalities with a sharp contrast in their visual design and in-universe role, they are more "grounded" compared to the game's more fantastical champions. Linke and Yee also used the existent mysteries set up by League of Legends, where their familial relations and enmity with each other are only hinted at in-game, to explore their pasts and the origins of their rivalry through the storylines written for Arcane. The show gave Linke and Yee an opportunity to focus on the small character details, like Vi's compulsive habit of bouncing her leg as a nuanced nervous tick, with the goal of making the characters' expressions feel real.

Vi and Caitlyn seemingly share romantic chemistry in certain scenes of Arcane, though they are not officially a couple. Linke and Yee intentionally kept the slower pacing of Vi and Caitlyn's relationship as they wanted to tell an organic story about the characters that feels true to their personalities and how they have been seen within the game. While the first season of Arcane primarily follows Vi's complicated relationship with Jinx, the showrunners indicated that the show's focus will shift to the developing relationship between Vi and Caitlyn for the second season.

Appearances

League of Legends
Vi was added to the roster of playable Champions for League of Legends on December 19, 2012. Vi's main weapons are the "Atlas Gauntlet", two massive gloves powered by Hextech that increases her physical strength to superhuman levels. Her gameplay mechanics has undergone a number of revisions since her introduction. Dot Esports noted while Vi's original moveset and statistics stood out for being more suited for the top lane, her abilities and their effects have remained mostly the same without any major changes. The character was banned from professional play for a time in early 2020 due to a potentially game-breaking bug. A “micropatch” was released in November 2021 to downgrade her base statistics and ultimate abilities, which were unintentionally boosted by a prior rescript that in Riot's opinion made her somewhat overpowered.

As established in flavor text written by McNeill, Vi grew up in one of the poorest areas of Zaun. She learned to survive its rough conditions using her brawn and wits, and eventually took leadership of a street gang at a young age, though she has always adhered to a strict moral code she imposed on herself. She disappeared during a time of great turmoil between Zaun and Piltover and was thought to be dead, only to reappear years later as Sheriff Caitlyn Kiramman's trusted partner in the Guardian corps.

Vi's relationship with Jinx, another Champion who would taunt her whenever they encounter each other, was the focus of speculation and fan theories from fans for many years prior to the release of Arcane. Vi also has specific interactions with another League of Legends Champion, Caitlyn, who is presented as her ally and colleague within series lore. Their respective lines of dialogue were interpreted by some players to be of a romantic nature, which were confirmed by the release of Arcane in 2021.

Arcane
Arcane establishes that Vi, confirmed to be shortened from Violet, and Jinx, originally known as Powder, are sisters who were orphaned following a failed rebellion by the inhabitants of Piltover's undercity against their upper-crust rulers. Along with two other orphans Mylo and Claggor, they are both adopted and raised by Vander, who abandoned his role as the leader of rebellion after coming to regret the resultant loss of life. At the commencement of season one, Vi leads a gang consisting of herself, Mylo, Claggor, and Powder, as they commit acts of burglary throughout Piltover. A failed robbery at the penthouse of a Piltovian scientist, Jayce, results in a massive explosion after Powder tampers with Jayce's experiments involving crystals powered by arcane magic, which provokes a sustained hunt for the culprits by the authorities of Piltover. Although the gang successfully escapes back into the undercity, Vi attempts to take responsibility for her actions as their leader and turn herself in to the authorities, but is stopped by Vander, who insists on being the scapegoat for the incident. Taking advantage of the situation, Vander's former friend Silco attempts to foment a new rebellion by capturing Vander and forcing him to undergo a chemically induced physical transformation using a drug called "Shimmer". The gang go to Vander's rescue, but Powder, trying to help them escape, causes another explosion which results in the deaths of Mylo and Claggor, while Vander dies saving Vi from Silco's thugs. Furious and distraught, Vi hits her sister and blames her for the incident, and storms off. Vi then sees Silco approaching Powder and attempts to return to her sister, but is chloroformed and abducted by a corrupt Piltover Enforcer and imprisoned without trial.

After spending many years in a prison called Stillwater, Vi is released by Caitlyn Kiramman, a young upstart member of Piltover's security forces who requests her assistance in her investigation into Silco's criminal enterprise. In a notable scene, Vi appears to flirt with Caitlyn, calling her "hot" and nicknaming her "cupcake". Returning to the undercity, now called Zaun, Vi and Caitlyn gathers evidence on Silco with the help of the Firelight faction led by Ekko, an old friend who worked for Benzo, an associate of Vander. Vi also encounters her sister, who now goes by the moniker of "Jinx" after having been adopted by Silco, and is jealous of Caitlyn's perceived closeness to her sister.

Following a Piltover Council meeting where its members are unable to reach a consensus to sanction direct action against Silco in spite of the presented evidence, Vi decides to ally with Jayce and assault Silco's operations with a contingent of Piltover Enforcers, but soon part ways with him due to their irreconcilable differences. Vi's next target is Silco's right-hand woman Sevika, and defeats her after an extended fight at the latter's bar, which was once owned by Vander. She is abducted by Jinx shortly afterwards, along with Caitlyn and Silco. Vi attempts to appeal to her sister's better nature after she threatens Caitlyn; Jinx instead shoots Silco to death by accident after she suffers a traumatic attack. Vi and Caitlyn manage to free themselves, and watch in horror as Jinx, having accepted her new identity and rebuked what remained of Powder, fires a rocket aimed for the Council of Piltover.

Other appearances
Vi has appeared in several League of Legends spin-off titles, including Teamfight Tactics, Legends of Runeterra and League of Legends: Wild Rift. In addition, Vi has been featured in various cross-promotional marketing efforts for Arcane. She appears as a playable character in PUBG Mobile, and as an outfit for Fortnite and Among Us.
 On December 10, 2019, Riot released a short story starring Vi titled, "Child of Zaun", which follows her journey back to Zaun as part of an investigation.

Promotion and merchandise
On July 2, 2021, Riot released a fully instrumental album titled Sessions: Vi, along with a YouTube animated video that spans the entire album. Riot collaborated with 21 different artists for the album, which has 37 tracks and spans one hour and 40 minutes. The album features lo-fi music which are themed after the idea of Vi unwinding to relaxing tunes as soon as she arrives home from work. Official merchandise themed after Vi include a PVC statue, and a long sleeve t-shirt.

Reception
Vi is one of the most popular and recognizable League of Legends champions. Ethan Garcia from Dot Esports described Vi as "a character who changed the perception of League in other media". The character's distinct appearance makes her popular subject for cosplay activities. By December 2021, Vi was identified with a pick rate of 9.4% among League of Legends players, placing her among the game's most played characters at the time.

Vi's depiction in Arcane garnered praise from audiences and critics, which contributed to her renewed popularity among League of Legends players in the 2020s. Hailee Steinfeld 's vocal performance was praised by critics. Xan Indigo from Screen Rant appreciated her portrayal as a self-willed and independent woman and her virtues of empathy, humanity and understanding. Jade King from The Gamer praised her character design, and expressed an appreciation that her physical characterization went beyond the male gaze, avoiding any sexualization of costume or design. King particularly liked how the character's body language and facial expressions, which conveys "an almost masculine swagger, was presented. 
 
Arcane portrayal of the relationship between Vi and Caitlyn is generally well received. GameRevolution reported that fan response on social media towards the suggestion of a relationship was particularly enthusiastic. Jeff Nelson from The Cheat Sheet highlighted the significance of their depiction as queer characters, in light of Riot Games' sensitivity to LGBTQ issues and their willingness to advocate for better inclusivity in its video games. Drawing a favorable comparison to She-Ra and the Princesses of Power, Indigo praised the handling of Vi's relationship with Caitlyn in Arcane, and the way that it shifts from distrust to intimacy gives "a profound touch of humanity within the series", serving as a metaphor for how it is possible to go beyond the differences between Piltover and Zaun. From Indigo's perspective, their tender moments are not completely left to subtext unlike in the video games, but made explicit by their dialogue and actions within important scenes, without an undue emphasis on stereotypes or having to ever use the term "gay" on the screens. On the other hand, Nico Deyo Polygon criticized the show's attempt to embrace "queer aesthetics" and its failure to properly portray overt romantic gestures between Vi and Caitlyn, which Deyo described as a "maybeship".

References

External links
Profile on official website

Animated human characters
Fantasy television characters
Fictional boxers
Female characters in animated series
Female characters in video games
Fictional fist-load fighters
Fictional gendarmerie personnel
Fictional gentleman thieves
Fictional lesbians
Fictional outlaws
Fictional police officers in video games
League of Legends
LGBT characters in animated television series
LGBT characters in video games
Orphan characters in video games
Video game characters introduced in 2012
Video game characters with superhuman strength
Vigilante characters in video games
Woman soldier and warrior characters in video games